Events in the year 1978 in Taiwan. This year is numbered Minguo 67 according to the official Republic of China calendar.

Incumbents 
 President – Yen Chia-kan, Chiang Ching-kuo
 Vice President – Chiang Ching-kuo, Hsieh Tung-min
 Premier – Chiang Ching-kuo, Sun Yun-suan
 Vice Premier – Hsu Ching-chung

Events

May
 20 May – Chiang Ching-kuo became the President of the Republic of China.

December
 10 December – The commissioning of first unit of Jinshan Nuclear Power Plant in Taipei County.

Births
 1 January – Huang Chin-chih, baseball player
 30 January – Chiang Tsu-ping, actress and television host
 23 March – Chu Hung-sen, baseball player
 14 May – Aimee Sun, socialite, heiress, media personality, jewelry designer, businesswoman, celebrity endorser, commercial actress and cover girl
 7 June – Penny Lin, actress
 14 June – Dee Hsu, television host, actress and singer
 17 July – Suming, singer and songwriter
 25 August – Giddens Ko, novelist and filmmaker
 14 September – Aya Liu, actress and hostess
 22 October – Chang Chih-chiang, baseball player
 14 November – Liu Fu-hao, baseball player
 26 December – Chiang Wan-an, member of Legislative Yuan, great grandson of Chiang Kai-shek

Deaths
 18 May – Wei Tao-ming, former Minister of Foreign Affairs.
 27 July – Zeng Baosun, historian.

References

 
Years of the 20th century in Taiwan